The  Treasurer of Australia (or Federal Treasurer) is a high ranking official and senior minister of the Crown in the Government of Australia who is the head of the Ministry of the Treasury which is responsible for government expenditure and for collecting revenue.  The Treasurer plays a key role in the economic policy of the government. The current Australian Treasurer is Jim Chalmers whose term began on 23 May 2022.

The Treasurer implements ministerial powers through the Department of the Treasury and a range of other government agencies. According to constitutional convention, the Treasurer is always a member of the Parliament of Australia with a seat in the House of Representatives. The office is generally seen as equivalent to the Chancellor of the Exchequer in the United Kingdom or the Secretary of the Treasury in the United States or, in some other countries, the finance minister. It is one of only four ministerial positions (along with Prime Minister, Minister for Defence and Attorney-General) that have existed since Federation.

Duties and importance
The Treasurer is the minister in charge of government revenue and expenditure. The Treasurer oversees economic policy: fiscal policy is within the Treasurer's direct responsibility, while monetary policy is implemented by the politically independent Reserve Bank of Australia, the head of which is appointed by the Treasurer. The Treasurer also oversees financial regulation. Each year in May, the Treasurer presents the Federal Budget to the Parliament.

The Prime Minister and Treasurer are traditionally members of the House, but the Constitution does not have such a requirement. The tradition is due to the fact that under the constitution, appropriate bills have to originate from the House, and if the Treasurer is a senator, they would not be able to introduce the bills. This would also mean another minister would need to give the nationally televised budget speech and introduce the bills. While no Federal Treasurer has been a member of the Senate, New South Wales, Victoria, Tasmania and South Australia had state Treasurers who had served as members of the Legislative Councils, the states' upper houses.

The Treasurer is a very senior government post, usually ranking second or third in Cabinet. Historically, many Treasurers have previously, concurrently or subsequently served as Prime Minister or Deputy Prime Minister; two subsequently served as Governor-General. Service as Treasurer is seen as an important (though certainly not essential) qualification for serving as Prime Minister: to date, six Treasurers have gone on to be Prime Minister.

Paul Keating and Wayne Swan are currently the only two to have been named "Euromoney Finance Minister of the Year" by Euromoney magazine.

Since 1958, Treasurers in Coalition Governments have often but not always been the deputy leader of the Liberal Party. In contrast, only four Labor Treasurers have also been the deputy leader of the Labor Party.

Related ministerial positions
Along with the Treasurer, other ministers have responsibility for the Department of the Treasury. The Treasurer together with these other ministers are known as the "Treasury Ministers". At present, the Treasury Minister positions are:
 Treasurer
 Assistant Treasurer
 Minister for Small Business

The work of the Department of Finance is closely related to the work of the Department of the Treasury. The ministers who have responsibility for the Department of Finance are:
 Minister for Finance
 Special Minister of State

Treasury Portfolio
Eleven organisations nominally fall under the auspices of the Australian Treasurer.  The agencies undertake a range of activities aimed at achieving strong sustainable economic growth and the improved well-being of Australians. This entails the provision of policy advice to portfolio ministers who seek to promote a sound macroeconomic environment; effective government spending and taxation arrangements; and well-functioning markets. It also entails the effective implementation and administration of policies that fall within the portfolio ministers' responsibilities.

 The Department of the Treasury creates policies and reports for four output groups. These groups are macroeconomic, fiscal, revenue, and markets:
 Macroeconomic reports include: domestic economic policy advice and forecasting; and international economic policy advice and assessment.
 Fiscal reports include: budget policy advice and coordination; Commonwealth-State financial policy advice; and industry, environment and social policy advice.
 Revenue reports include: taxation and income support policy advice.
 Markets reports include: foreign investment policy advice and administration; financial system and corporate governance policy advice; competition and consumer policy advice; and actuarial services. In addition, the Royal Australian Mint is responsible for producing Australia's circulating currency.
 The Australian Bureau of Statistics is Australia's official statistical agency. Its reports are created for informed decision-making, research and discussion within governments and the community, based on the provision of a high quality, objective and responsive national statistical service. It principally relates to the production of economic, population and social statistics.
 The Australian Competition and Consumer Commission outputs are directed at enhanced social and economic welfare of the Australian community by fostering competitive, efficient, fair and informed Australian markets. It strives for compliance with competition, fair trading and consumer protection laws and appropriate remedies when the law is not followed; and competitive market structures and informed behaviour.
 The Australian Office of Financial Management manages the Commonwealth's net debt portfolio. Its reports on debt management directed at ensuring that the Commonwealth net debt portfolio is managed at least cost, subject to the Government's policies and risk references.
 The Australian Prudential Regulation Authority is the financial supervisor responsible for prudentially regulating the banking, other deposit-taking, insurance and superannuation industries. It aims at enhanced public confidence in Australia's financial institutions through a framework of prudential regulation which balances financial safety and efficiency, competition, contestability and competitive neutrality.
 The Australian Securities and Investments Commission (ASIC) is the independent government body that enforces and administers the Corporations Law and Consumer Protection Law for investments, life and general insurance, superannuation and banking (except lending). Its outputs aim at a fair and efficient financial market characterised by integrity and transparency and supporting confident and informed participation of investors and consumers. Outputs include: policy and guidance about the laws administered by ASIC; comprehensive and accurate information on companies and corporate activity; compliance, monitoring and licensing of participants in the financial system to protect consumer interests and ensure market integrity; and enforcement activity to give effect to the laws administered by ASIC.
 The Australian Taxation Office outputs are directed at effectively managed and shaped systems that support and fund services for Australians and give effect to social and economic policy through the tax, superannuation, excise and other related systems. Outputs include: shape, design and build administrative systems; management of revenue collection and transfers; compliance assurance and support - revenue collection; compliance assurance and support for transfers and regulation of superannuation funds compliance with retirement income standards; and services to governments and agencies.
 The Corporations and Markets Advisory Committee (CAMAC) creates reports directed at confident and informed participation of investors and consumers in the financial system. It makes recommendations to the responsible Minister on the Corporations Law, and produces an annual report. It publishes this annual report, along with other discussion papers and reports.
 The Inspector-General of Taxation is an independent statutory office to review systemic tax administration issues and to report to the Government with recommendations for improving tax administration for the benefit of all taxpayers.
 The National Competition Council is an independent advisory body for all Australian governments involved in implementing the National Competition Policy. Its outputs are aimed at the achievement of effective and fair competition reforms and better use of Australia's infrastructure for the benefit of the community. Outputs include: advice provided to governments on competition policy and infrastructure access issues; and clear, accessible public information on competition policy.
 The Productivity Commission contributes to well informed policy decision-making and public understanding on matters relating to Australia's productivity and living standards, based on independent and transparent analysis from a community-wide perspective. Outputs include or relate to: government commissioned projects; performance reporting and other services to government bodies; regulation review activities; competitive neutrality complaints activities; and supporting research and activities and statutory annual reporting

List of Treasurers
The following individuals have been appointed as Treasurer of Australia:

 Treasurers Watson, Fisher, Scullin, Lyons, Fadden, Menzies, Chifley, Whitlam, Hawke and Morrison were also Prime Minister during some or all of their period as Treasurer.
 Morrison was appointed as Treasurer by the Governor-General on Morrison's advice in May 2021, with both Morrison and Frydenberg holding the position of Treasurer until May 2022. However, the appointment of Morrison was not made public until August 2022.

List of Assistant Treasurers
The following individuals have been appointed as Assistant Treasurer, or any precedent titles:

List of assistant ministers for competition, charities and treasury
The following individuals have been appointed as Assistant Minister for Competition, Charities and Treasury, or preceding titles:

Former ministerial titles

List of ministers for competition policy and consumer affairs
The Competition and Consumer Act 2010 (formerly the Trade Practices Act 1974) is administered by the Treasurer through the Australian Competition and Consumer Commission, but was formerly administered by other ministers. The following individuals were appointed as ministers with responsibility for competition and consumer affairs matters:

References

External links

 

Lists of government ministers of Australia